Marshall's Island is a small island within the Great Sound of Bermuda. It lies in the southeast of the sound, and is in the north of Warwick Parish. The island is in two distinct parts, joined by a narrow neck. Previously owned by the Royal Navy, it is now privately owned.

Islands of Bermuda
Warwick Parish
Private islands of Bermuda